Diboride may refer to:

Aluminium diboride, compound of aluminium and boron
Hafnium diboride, ultra-high temperature ceramic composed of hafnium and boron
Magnesium diboride, inexpensive and simple superconductor
Rhenium diboride, synthetic superhard material
Titanium diboride, extremely hard ceramic compound composed of titanium and boron
Zirconium diboride, highly covalent refractory ceramic material with a hexagonal crystal structure

Due to their technological importance, refractory and electrically conductive diborides (TMB2) formed by Group 4–6 transition metals (TM): Ti, Zr, Hf, V, Nb, Ta, Cr, Mo, and W are attracting increasing research interest as thin film coatings in many potential applications. The family of boron-containing compounds, thin films and bulk, is larger than TMB2 as boron interacts with many of the elements in the periodic table to form a variety of compounds with different properties. Examples are monoborides and covalently bonded borides with high hardness, like aluminum magnesium boride (BAM) with the composition AlMgB14, and superconducting MgB2. Application examples are as high-temperature electrodes, advanced nuclear fission and fusion reactors, molten metal environment, refractory crucibles, thermocouple protection tubes in steel baths and aluminum reduction cells, reinforcement fibers, solar power, aerospace, as well as in armor applications.

References